Earl Smith is the name of:

Sports
Earl Smith (catcher) (1897–1963), MLB catcher, 1919–1930
Earl Smith (1910s outfielder) (1891–1943), MLB outfielder, 1916–1922
Earl Smith (1950s outfielder) (1928–2014), NL outfielder who played in the 1955 season
J. R. Smith (Earl Smith III, born 1985), former NBA player
Earl Smith (coach) (1917–2012), coach of many sports at Campbell University and East Carolina University, 1946–1953

Others
Earl H. Smith (1909–1987), Pennsylvania politician
Earl "Chinna" Smith (born 1955), Jamaican guitarist
Earl E. T. Smith (1903–1991), US Ambassador to Cuba, 1958–1959
Earl W. Smith, Republican candidate for mayor of Columbus, Ohio
Earl Smith (sociologist), American sociologist